52 Broadway, formerly known as the Exchange Court Building or Chemical Bank Building, is a high-rise building on Broadway and Exchange Place in the Financial District of Lower Manhattan, New York City. The building was originally built with 12 floors in 1898 by architects Clinton and Russell, but it was gutted and stripped of its entire facade in 1980-1982 by Emery Roth & Sons.

Tenants
In September 1903, the Consolidated National Bank took out a five-year lease on around 2,500 square feet of ground floor at the Exchange Court Building, which was located at the corner of Broadway and Exchange Place.

The naval architectural firm Gielow & Orr had their headquarters in the building in the early 20th century. The United Federation of Teachers currently has its headquarters in the building.

References

External links
 

1898 establishments in New York City
Broadway (Manhattan)
Consolidated National Bank
Financial District, Manhattan
Office buildings completed in 1898
Skyscraper office buildings in Manhattan